The Ministry of Infrastructure is a ministry within government of Poland currently responsible for transport, inland navigation, water and maritime resources and exploatation. Incumbent Minister of Infrastructure is Andrzej Adamczyk since 15 November 2019. Ministry headquarters are located at 4/6 Chałubińskiego Street in Warsaw.

History
 1919–1924 – Ministry of Railways
 1924–1926 – Ministry of Railways
 1926–1939 – Ministry of Communications
 1944 – Center for Communication, Post and Telegraph
 1944–1945 – Communication Center
 1945–1951 – Ministry of Communications
 1951–1957 – Ministry of Railways
 1957 – Ministry of Road and Air Transport
 1957–1958 – Ministry of Communications
 1957–1987 – Ministry of Communications
 1987–1989 – Ministry of Transport, Shipping and Communications
 1989–2001 – Ministry of Transport and Maritime Economy
 
 The ministry was originally created under the premiership of Leszek Miller in October 2001, yet was abolished in 2005 under the Law and Justice government of Kazimierz Marcinkiewicz, reorganized as the Ministry of Transport and Construction (2005–2006) and later by the Ministry of Transport (2006–2007). Following the 2007 election of Civic Platform under Donald Tusk, the ministry was again reorganized into the Ministry of Infrastructure.
 
 Following the reelection of Tusk in the 2011 parliamentary elections, the Council of Ministers moved to abolish the Infrastructure Ministry on 21 November 2011. It was replaced by the Ministry of Transport, Construction and Maritime Economy, and the Ministry of Administration and Digitization.
 
 
 2001–2005 – Ministry of Infrastructure
 2005–2006 – Ministry of Transport and Construction
 2006–2007 – Ministry of Transport
 2007–2011 – Ministry of Infrastructure
 2011–2013 – Ministry of Transport, Construction and Maritime Economy
 2013–2015 – Ministry of Infrastructure and Development
 2015–2018 – Ministry of Infrastructure and Construction

Headquarters
The building of the Ministry of Communication is a modernist office building at 4/6 Tytusa Chałubińskiego Street in Warsaw, erected between 1929 and 1931, designed by Rudolf Świerczyński.

In the years 1948–1950 the complex of buildings was significantly expanded according to the design of Bohdan Pniewski. The high-rise part can be considered as the first skyscraper built in Warsaw, and probably in the whole country after World War II.

In the period 1945–2000 the Polish State Railways were also managed from this building.

List of ministers

References

External links

 Ministry of Infrastructure
 Ministry of Infrastructure 

Government of Poland
Poland